The Dorf- und Uhrenmuseum Gütenbach is located in the village of Gütenbach, one of the historic centers of homebased manufacturing of clocks in the Black Forest region of Germany near the  town of Furtwangen im Schwarzwald. It features primarily permanent and temporary exhibits on the local history of clockmaking, focussing on the history of making wooden clock movements.  There also is a smaller general display on local history and rural living conditions in the 18th and 19th century.

Highlights include:
 An overview of the history of the wooden black forest clock movement
 A unique collection of homemade tools, jigs and fixtures for making clock movements
 A broad collection of one of kind black forest clocks, including organ clocks and cuckoo clocks, many made within the village of Gütenbach

The Museum is located in the former schoolhouse of the village, next to the church, on a hill above the village center.

Similar museums
In the same region:
 Deutsches Uhrenmuseum, in Furtwangen im Schwarzwald
 Uhrenindustriemuseum, in Villingen-Schwenningen
 Schwarzwaldmuseum, in  Triberg
 Stadtmuseum, in Schramberg
Outside Germany:
Cuckooland Museum, in the U. K.

See also
 Horology

References

External links
 Dorf- und Uhrenmuseum Gütenbach

Horological museums in Germany
Museums in Baden-Württemberg